Towcester Town Hall is a municipal building in Watling Street, Towcester, Northamptonshire, England. The town hall, which is the meeting place of Towcester Town Council, is a grade II listed building.

History
After significant population growth during the early 19th century associated with the town's role as a coaching stop on Watling Street, a turnpike road which had been paved by the engineer, Thomas Telford, local businessmen decided to form a company to develop a town hall and corn exchange: the site chosen was a prominent location in the market place which clearly defined its southern boundary.

The foundation stone for the building was laid by the Earl of Pomfret, who lived at Easton Neston house, on 8 September 1865. It was designed by T. H. Vernon in the Italianate style, built by J. Wheeler with ashlar stone and was completed in 1866. The design involved a symmetrical main frontage with three bays facing onto Chantry Lane; the central bay, which slightly projected forward, featured a round headed doorway flanked by pilasters and brackets supporting a stone parapet; there were two small rounded headed sash windows separated by a colonette and flanked by pilasters on the first floor and a carved pediment above. The outer bays featured two large round headed sash windows separated by pilasters on the ground floor and three small rounded headed windows separated by colonettes on the first floor. At roof level there was a clock tower with a copper-clad belfry. The clock was made by Arthur Garrett of Towcester. Internally, the principal room was the public hall.

After further growth and improved connections following the opening of Towcester railway station in April 1866, the area was designated a rural district in 1894. The building continued to serve as the headquarters of the local rural district council for much of the 20th century and remained the local seat of government after the enlarged South Northamptonshire Council was formed in 1974.

After South Northamptonshire Council decided to relocate to modern and more substantial promises nearby, the town hall became the responsibility of the parish council in 1983. The parish council was superseded by Towcester Town Council which established offices in the town hall and subsequently used the building as its meeting place. Although the committee room on the ground floor was leased out to estate agents, Bartram & Co. in January 2018, the public hall has continued to be used for concerts and community events.

References

Government buildings completed in 1866
City and town halls in Northamptonshire
Towcester
Grade II listed buildings in Northamptonshire